Jason Scott (born 1970) is an American archivist and historian of technology.

Jason Scott may also refer to:

Jason Scott (rower) (born 1970), American Olympic rower
Jason Lee Scott, fictional character played by Austin St. John on the children's television series Power Rangers
Jason Scott Lee (born 1966), American actor and martial artist
 Jason Scott, former member of Life Tabernacle Church and plaintiff in the Jason Scott case against anti-cult activist Rick Ross and the Cult Awareness Network
 Jason Scott, musician for the Australian band Coloured Stone
 Jason Scott, plot-writer for computer games whose credits include the 1999 FreeSpace 2